Jonathan Robertson (born 29 May 1991) is a Dutch professional footballer who plays for Ter Leede in the Dutch Topklasse. He formerly played for Almere City and FC Oss.

Career
Born in Amsterdam, Robertson made his professional debut for Almere City (then called FC Omniworld) in the 2010–11 season.

References

1991 births
Living people
Dutch footballers
Footballers from Amsterdam
Eerste Divisie players
Association football midfielders
TOP Oss players
Almere City FC players
Ter Leede players